Three submarines of the French Navy have borne the name Dauphin:

 , an experimental submarine launched as X and renamed in 1911 
 , a  launched in 1925 and scuttled in 1943
 , a Narval-class submarine launched in 1958 and stricken in 1992

French Navy ship names